Gottlobite), is a mineral found as isolated crystals or isometric grains of orange or orange-brown color. The size of the crystals are a half millimeter in diameter and are part of the orthorhombic crystal system. Gottlobite forms a solid solution with adelite, which is an end member composition of CaMg(VO4)(OH), as well as being classified in the adelite group. Gottlobite is also part of the vanadates and arsenates group. With these characteristics, it is similar to the minerals tangeite and austinite by X-ray diffraction methods.

Occurrence
Gottlobite is a relatively rare mineral where only a small quantity of the mineral has been found. It was first observed at the site of a long-abandoned mine on the northern slope of Gottlob hill in Friedrichroda, Thuringia, Germany by Jὒrgen Graf in August of 1996. As such, gottlobite got its name from its locality. Additionally, the German translation of "Lob" means "praise" and the German translation of "Gott" means "God," as deciphered by Google Translate. In the mine at this location, Gottlobite is found in hydrothermal veins of barite that are cutting through conglomerate. The crystals of gottlobite can be found embedded in these barite veins or as stand-alone crystals on surrounding minerals. The associated minerals in the area are hausmannite, barite, vanadian adelite, and muscovite.

Composition

Analytical methods used on gottlobite to determine its chemical composition include energy-dispersive X-ray spectrometry (EDX) and wavelength-dispersive X-ray spectrometry (WDX). EDX revealed the presence and quantities of elements present in the mineral, including Ca, V, As, O and small amounts of Sr. This was then measured in terms of oxides, where the weight percents were 24.98 for CaO, 0.92 for SrO, 17.54 for MgO, 1.50 for MnO, 1.44 for CuO, 27.47 for V2O5, 20.32 for As2O5, and 5.4 for H2O. Mg is in gottlobite's chemical formula, but was not found in the EDX testing because of very similar pattern of arsenic lines that were overlapping with magnesium. As seen in the formula, it was also determined that the arsenic and vanadium atoms are in 4-fold (tetrahedral) coordination with oxygen, and the magnesium atoms are in six-fold (octahedral) coordination.

See also 
 List of minerals

References

External links
 Gottlobit

Hydroxide minerals